SKAI is a Ukrainian pop-rock band.

Skai may refer to:

 Skai Group, Greek media group, contains :
 Skai TV, a Greek television network.
 Skai 100.3, a Greek radio station.
 Skai.io, a marketing technology company based in Israel 
 a fictional river located near the town of Ulthar in the Dreamlands stories of H. P. Lovecraft.
 Leatherette, artificial leather made by German company Konrad Hornschuch
 Skai Moore (born 1995), American football linebacker (NFL, Indianapolis Colts)
 Skai Jackson (born 2002), American actress, YouTuber and author

See also 
 Skay (disambiguation)
 Sky (disambiguation)
 Skei (disambiguation)